Ragnhild Kristensen is a Norwegian orienteering competitor. She competed at the very first World Orienteering Championships in Fiskars in 1966, where she placed 11th in the individual course, and won a bronze medal in the relay event, together with Astrid Hansen and Ingrid Thoresen.

References

Year of birth missing (living people)
Living people
Norwegian orienteers
Female orienteers
Foot orienteers
World Orienteering Championships medalists
20th-century Norwegian women